Arnholdt Kongsgård (23 November 1914 – 22 January 1991) was a Norwegian ski jumper who competed before World War II. He won a ski jumping bronze medal at the 1939 World Ski Championships in Zakopane. He had previously finished sixth at the 1938 World Ski Championships and eighth at the 1936 Winter Olympics.

Kongsgård was the second record holder of Vikersundbakken, holding the hill record from 1946 to 1951.

He represented the club Kongsberg IF.

References 

1914 births
1991 deaths
Norwegian male ski jumpers
People from Kongsberg
Olympic ski jumpers of Norway
Ski jumpers at the 1936 Winter Olympics
FIS Nordic World Ski Championships medalists in ski jumping
Kongsberg IF ski jumpers
Sportspeople from Viken (county)
20th-century Norwegian people